Połock Voivodeship was a unit of administrative division and local government in the  Polish–Lithuanian Commonwealth (Grand Duchy of Lithuania) since the 15th century until the partitions of Poland in 1793.

The voivodeship history can be traced to the Principality of Polotsk, conquered by the Grand Duchy of Lithuania around late 14th / early 15th centuries. From 1504 the former Principality was recognized as a voivodeship.

Zygmunt Gloger in his monumental book Historical Geography of the Lands of Old Poland provides this description of the Połock Voivodeship:

“Połock, in Latin Polocia, Polocium, lies on the right bank of the Dvina, and is regarded as one of the oldest gords of Rus’. In the 13th century, the Principality of Polotsk was ruled by Kievan princes, but in app. 1225 it was seized by the Lithuanians under Duke Mindaugas (...) Duke Vytautas named the first starosta of Połock, and in app. 1500, the starosta was renamed into the Voivode of Połock, while the Duchy was turned into a voivodeship, divided into halves by the Dvina (...)

The voivodeship had two senators, who were the Voivode and the Castellan of Połock (...) Since it was not too large and its population was not numerous, furthermore, its capital was located in the middle, the voivodeship was not divided into counties. Its courts were located in Połock, where the sejmiks also took place. Połock Voivodeship had two envoys in the Sejm, and two deputies to the Lithuanian Tribunal”.

Other names

Population
 109 848 in 1790

Administration

Voivodeship Governor (Wojewoda) seat: 
 Połock

Administrative division:
 this voivodeship was not divided into counties

Number of Senators: 
 2

Number of envoys in the Sejm: 
 2

Voivodes
Stanisław Hlebowicz 
Olbracht Gasztołd 
Stanisław Ościk
Piotr Kiszka 
Jan Hlebowicz
Stanisław Dowojno 
Mikołaj Dorohostajski 
Andrzej Sapieha 
Michał Drucki-Sokoliński
Janusz Kiszka 
Aleksander Ludwik Radziwiłł 
Jan Karol Kopeć 
Kazimierz Jan Sapieha
Jan Jacek Ogiński 
Dominik Michał Słuszka 
Stanisław Ernest Denhoff 
Aleksander Michał Sapieha 
Józef Sylwester Sosnowski 
Tadeusz Żaba

References

Bibliography
 Polock Voivodeship, description by Zygmunt Gloger

 
Voivodeships of the Polish–Lithuanian Commonwealth
Former voivodeships of Grand Duchy of Lithuania
1504 establishments in Lithuania
1793 disestablishments in the Polish–Lithuanian Commonwealth
Early Modern history of Belarus
Polotsk